There have been no official People's Republic of ChinaHoly See relations as the Holy See instead recognizes the Republic of China as the representative of China.

However, in September 2018 the People's Republic of China and the Holy See signed an agreement allowing the pope to appoint and veto bishops approved by the Chinese Communist Party (CCP). The agreement was renewed for another two years in October 2020.

History

The Beijing government broke off diplomatic relations with the Holy See in 1951 after a complicated incident. Throughout 1950 and 1951, the People's Republic of China had been putting pressure on the Vatican by threatening a breakaway of "independent Catholics", but many priests opposed the movement, and Zhou Enlai sought a middle ground. A deadly controversy was then manufactured: a priest working at the Holy See internunciature (legation) had thrown out an old 1930s-era mortar in a trash pile out of his home. A businessman named Antonio Riva discovered the mortar and took a non-functioning piece of it back to his house to display as an antique. When Communist officials saw Riva's curio in his home, they arrested him for conspiracy to assassinate Mao Zedong, which Riva denied. Riva was executed and the Holy See's diplomatic mission was banished from the country for "espionage". Tarcisio Martina, the regional apostolic prefect, was sentenced to life in prison and died in 1961, while four other "conspirators" were given shorter sentences.

The Beijing government has set two conditions for reestablishing the relations: that the Holy See "not interfere in religious matters in China" and that, in line with Beijing's One-China policy, it break the ties with the Taipei government. Such ties were established after the expulsion of Archbishop Riberi, and have been maintained at the level of chargé d'affaires ever since the United Nations' recognition of the Beijing government as the government of China. The Holy See has indicated that it would have no difficulty about the second condition, but requires discussion about the concrete meaning of the first. The main point of contention concerns the appointing of Catholic bishops in mainland China, who are now named by the Catholic Patriotic Association (CPA), at some periods in agreement with the Holy See, at other times in direct opposition to its declared wishes. The PRC government's position is that bishops should be appointed by itself; the Holy See's position is that bishops can only be appointed by the Pope, while envisaging in some cases a form of consultation with the civil authorities.

2007 letter to Chinese Catholics 
The Holy See made efforts in 2007 to create formal ties with the PRC. Theodore McCarrick had been an envoy as part of such efforts. High-ranking bishops in the Roman Catholic Church implied that such a diplomatic move was possible, predicated on the PRC granting more freedom of religion and interfering less in the hierarchy of the church in mainland China.

In September 2007, the appointment of Father Joseph Li Shan by the PRC authorities was said to be "tacitly approved" by the Vatican. In May 2008, the China Philharmonic Orchestra from mainland China performed a concert for the Pope inside the Vatican, prompting analysts to speak of a "growing rapprochement" between the two countries. On 8 April 2011 the Financial Times reported that Baron Von Pfetten organised the first major breakthrough discussion at leadership level during a three days closed door seminar in his French château where a senior Chinese visiting delegation met with Monseigneur Balestrero the Holy See Undersecretary for Relations with States. Francis, Pope since March 2013, said in a news media interview that he wished to visit China and improve the China-Holy See relationship. It was also reported that on a Papal visit to South Korea in August 2014 China opened up its airspace to the Pope's plane, and while crossing the Chinese airspace the Pope sent a telegram expressing his "best wishes" to the Chinese people.

2018 Holy See–China agreement

In January 2018, the Church was close to negotiating a deal with China that allows China to have more control over the underground churches and allows the Vatican to have more control over the appointment of bishops. While this did not amount to the establishment of formal diplomatic ties, this was seen as a huge step towards formal recognition. However, Cardinal Joseph Zen Ze-kiun, the former Bishop of Hong Kong, regarded the warming of diplomatic relationships as selling out the Catholic Church in China, as the process involves the resignation of several bishops of the underground church. A vigil was held by the Justice and Peace Commission of the Hong Kong Catholic Diocese in response from 12 to 13 February in St Bonaventure Church.

On 22 September 2018, the Chinese government and the Vatican signed a historic agreement concerning the appointment of bishops in China. China's foreign ministry said that the agreement works to maintain communications and improve relations between the parties. They did not establish diplomatic relations and the Vatican maintained diplomatic ties with the Republic of China on Taiwan, which the People's Republic of China does not recognize. Vatican spokesman Greg Burke described the agreement as "not political but pastoral, allowing the faithful to have bishops who are in communion with Rome but at the same time recognized by Chinese authorities." While the agreement states that China will recommend bishops before they are appointed by the pope, it also stipulates that the pope has authority to veto a bishop China recommends. Francis then approved seven bishops who had been appointed by Beijing, after withdrawing Church censures against those six and one recently deceased bishop, who had all received episcopal consecration without papal approval. On 23 September, the Catholic Church in China pledged to remain loyal to the Chinese Communist Party. On 26 September, in a letter to Chinese Catholics, Pope Francis wrote:

The agreement reflects the long-standing desire of the Chinese government to end the Holy See's recognition of the government in Taiwan, even as the Chinese Communist Party of General Secretary Xi Jinping continues the campaign, launched in the spring of 2018, to increase control of foreign religious institutions. In October 2018, local Chinese government officials destroyed two Marian shrines, one in Shanxi and one in Guizhou.

While some have raised concerns that China was no longer enforcing the terms of the 2018 agreement, both parties extended the agreement in October 2020 for two more years. In July 2022, Pope Francis stated that he hoped the Provisional Agreement would be renewed in October 2022, describing the agreement as "moving well." As of July 2022, seven bishops before 2018 were brought into communion with the Vatican and only six new bishops have been appointed under the 2018 agreement.

In October 2022, the agreement was renewed for another two years. In November 2022, the Vatican accused the Chinese government of violating the terms of the agreement.

See also 
 Chinese Regional Bishops' Conference of Taiwan
 Roman Catholicism in China

References

 
1951 in Christianity
Bilateral relations of the Holy See
Holy See